The East Jefferson Avenue Residential District in Detroit, Michigan, includes the Thematic Resource (TR) in the multiple property submission to the National Register of Historic Places which was approved on October 9, 1985. The structures are single-family and multiple-unit residential buildings with construction dates spanning nearly a century, from 1835 to 1931. The area is located on the lower east side of the city.

History

The road that is now East Jefferson Avenue existed from the earliest days of Detroit. Then known as the "River Road," it paralleled the Detroit River east of Detroit, connecting the French ribbon farms to Ste. Anne Street in the heart of Detroit. After the disastrous fire of 1805, Judge Augustus Woodward platted out a new design for the city, widening Ste. Anne St. and renaming it (and the connecting River Road) "Jefferson Avenue" in honor of Thomas Jefferson.

Jefferson quickly became the commercial nexus of Detroit; by 1820 over half the businesses on the city were located on the avenue. Additionally, many prominent Detroit residents of the time lived along Jefferson, including Charles Christopher Trowbridge, William Hull, Solomon Sibley, John R. Williams, Antoine Dequindre, Joseph Campau, Oliver Newberry, and Oliver Miller. As Detroit grew and city services expanded, Jefferson was one of the first streets to obtain new installations, getting iron water pipes in 1838, a horse-drawn bus line in 1847, horse-drawn rail in 1863, electric arc lighting in 1883, and asphalt pavement in 1892.

After the Civil War, many newly prosperous Detroit citizens built prestigious homes along Jefferson in a variety of popular architectural styles, including Gothic Revival, Richardsonian Romanesque, Queen Anne, and Italianate.

As the 19th century drew to a close and the 20th century began, the area around Jefferson Avenue became more industrialized. Wealthy residents, spurred by the availability of streetcar lines (and later, the automobiles), moved farther from the city center, leaving Jefferson Avenue behind. However, the booming city economy and influx of new residents in the 1910s increased demand for new housing. East Jefferson Avenue became an epicenter for new luxury apartment buildings, built particularly in the 1920s and 1930s.

Following World War II, East Jefferson became more commercial with the introduction of modern commercial structures. Yet, East Jefferson contains clusters of preserved historic structures.

Gallery of Lost Residences.

Architecture
The Thematic Resource includes twenty-eight architecturally and historically significant structures, stretching along a scenic three-mile section of East Jefferson Avenue beginning just east of downtown Detroit. Each of the structures included are, in some way, representative of the "high style" architecture of the period. The structures listed have a high degree of architectural integrity, with building alteration primarily confined to interior remodeling or additions; in all buildings, the Jefferson Avenue façade remains substantially intact. Four of the historic structures along East Jefferson listed on the T.R. have been demolished after their addition to the Register.

The structures included are as follows:
{| class="wikitable"
!Resource name
!Image
!Address
!Built
!Architect
!Notes
|-
|Alden Park Towers
|
|8100 East Jefferson Avenue
|1923
|Edwin Rorke
|
|-
|John N. Bagley House
|
|2921 East Jefferson Avenue
|1889
|Rogers and MacFarlane
|
|-
|Joseph Campau House
|
|2910 East Jefferson Avenue
|1835
|Unknown
|
|-
|Garden Court Apartments
|
|2900 East Jefferson Avenue
|1915
|Albert Kahn
|
|-
|Hibbard Apartment Building
|
|8905 East Jefferson Avenue
|1924
|Robert O. Derrick
|
|-
|The Kean
|
|8925 East Jefferson Avenue
|1931
|Charles Noble
|
|-
|Manchester Apartments
|
|2016 East Jefferson Avenue
|1915
|Unknown
|
|-
|The Palms
|
|1001 East Jefferson Avenue
|1903
|Albert Kahn
|
|-
|Arthur M. Parker House
|
|8115 East Jefferson Avenue
|1901
|Malcomson & Higginbotham
|
|-
|Pasadena Apartments
|
|2170 East Jefferson Avenue
|1902
|Mortimer L. Smith & Sons
|
|-
|Somerset Apartments
|
|1523 East Jefferson Avenue
|1922
|Unknown
|
|-
|Frederick K. Stearns House
|
|8109 East Jefferson Avenue
|1902
|Stratton & Baldwin
|
|-
|William H. Wells House
|
|2931 East Jefferson Avenue
|1889
|William Henry Miller
|
|-
|The Whittier
|
|415 Burns Drive
|1922,1926
|Charles N. Agree
|
|}

In addition, the following nine residential structures were previously listed on the NRHP, either individually or as part of an historic district:
{| class="wikitable"
!Resource Name
!Image
!Address
!Built
!Architect
!Notes
|-
|Croul-Palms House
|
|1394 East Jefferson Avenue
|1881
|William Scott
|
|-
|Thomas A. Parker House
|
|975 East Jefferson Avenue
|1868
|Gordon W. Lloyd
|
|-
|Charles Trowbridge House
|
|1380 East Jefferson Avenue
|1826
|Unknown
|Oldest surviving building in Detroit.
|-
|Moross House
|
|1460 East Jefferson Avenue
|1855
|Christopher Moross
|
|-
|Edwin Nelson House
|
|8311 East Jefferson Avenue
|
|
|Part of the Indian Village Historic District
|-
|James Hamilton House
|
|8325 East Jefferson Avenue
|1902
|Stratton & Baldwin
|Part of the Indian Village Historic District
|-
|William F. Harris House
|
|8335 East Jefferson Avenue
|
|
|Part of the Indian Village Historic District
|-
|Mary S. Smith House
|
|8445 East Jefferson Avenue
|
|
|Part of the Indian Village Historic District
|-
|James Burgess Book Jr. House
|
|8469 East Jefferson Avenue
|1911
|Louis Kamper
|Part of the Indian Village Historic District.
|}

Significance
The structures in this Thematic Resource vary greatly in style, construction, and use, but all are related by the common theme of residential development and general upper-class nature. Each of the structures included are, in some way, representative of the "high style" architecture of the period. The structures are divided into four groups, according to their original use and construction date.

The first group includes the single-family residences built by prominent Detroit citizens before the Civil War. This group includes the Joseph Campau House (1835) and the Alexander Chene House (1855) listed in this T.R., as well as the Charles Trowbridge House (1826) and the Moross House (1855), both listed on the NRHP at an earlier date. These structures are distinguished by their relatively modest appearance, although at the time of their construction they were fashionable homes housing prominent Detroit citizens.

The second group includes the single-family residences built by wealthy Detroiters in the latter part of the 19th century and in the early 20th century. This group includes the John N. Bagley House (1889), the William H. Wells House (1889), the Franklin H. Walker House (1896), the Arthur M. Parker House (1901), and the Frederick K. Stearns House (1902), all listed in this T.R., as well as the Thomas A. Parker House (1868), the Croul-Palms House (1881), and homes in the Indian Village Historic District which were listed on the NRHP at an earlier date. These architect-designed structures are distinguished by their elaborate and expensive construction and exemplification of popular architectural styles.

The third group includes the large-scale luxury apartment buildings built in the early 20th century. These large, luxurious apartment buildings were the first multiple-unit structures to make inroads into the previously exclusive single-family residential East Jefferson neighborhood, with the Pasadena Apartments (1902) and The Palms (1903) being the earliest examples. The larger apartment buildings continued to be constructed along Jefferson, with the much larger Garden Court Apartments (1915), the Whittier Hotel (1922–1926), and the Alden Park Towers (1922) built over the next two decades, and The Kean (1931) built just as the Great Depression halted construction for years. These structures are distinguished by their relatively large size and (originally) sizable and luxurious apartments.

The fourth group includes the more modest (but still well-appointed) smaller scale apartment buildings constructed in the 1910s and 1920s to cater to more upper-middle-class tenants such as automobile company workers and professionals. This group includes  the Manchester Apartments (1915), Jefferson Hall (1916), the Ponchartrain Apartments (1920), the Chateau Frontenac Apartments (1925), the Somerset Apartments (1922), and the Hibbard Apartment Building (1924). These structures are distinguished by their smaller scale and less well-appointed but still high quality rooms.

References

 

Houses on the National Register of Historic Places in Michigan
National Register of Historic Places Multiple Property Submissions in Michigan
Historic districts in Michigan
National Register of Historic Places in Detroit